"The Girl Is Mine" is a 1983 single by Michael Jackson and Paul McCartney.

The Girl Is Mine may also refer to:

 "The Girl Is Mine" (99 Souls song), 2015
 The Girl Is Mine (film), 1950 British drama film

See also
 The Boy Is Mine (disambiguation)